Khazan (also Romanized as Khazān; also known as Khīzu) is a village in Shakhen Rural District, in the Central District of Birjand County, South Khorasan Province, Iran. At the 2016 census, its population was 273, in 98 families.

References 

Populated places in Birjand County